The 1928 Cork Junior Hurling Championship was the 32nd staging of the Cork Junior Hurling Championship since its establishment by the Cork County Board.

On 21 January 1929, St. Anne's won the championship following a 3–01 to 2–00 defeat of Ballinacurra in the final. This was their second championship title overall and their first title since 1925.

References

Cork Junior Hurling Championship
Cork Junior Hurling Championship